Badreh County is in Ilam province, Iran. The capital of the county is the city of Badreh. At the 2006 census, the county's population (as Badreh District of Darreh Shahr County) was 16,478 in 3,382 households. The following census in 2011 counted 16,096 people in 4,045 households. At the 2016 census, the county's population was 15,614 in 4,311 households, by which time the district had been separated from the county to form Badreh County.

Administrative divisions

The population history and structural changes of Badreh County's administrative divisions over three consecutive censuses are shown in the following table. The latest census shows two districts, four rural districts, and one city.

References

Counties of Ilam Province